Stewie ( 2005 – February 4, 2013) was the world's longest domestic cat, according to the Guinness Book of World Records.

Stewie died on February 4, 2013, from cancer at his home in Reno, Nevada, at age 8.

See also
 List of individual cats

References

2005 animal births
2013 animal deaths
Individual cats in the United States
Male mammals